Ellis Ferreira and Rick Leach were the defending champions but they competed with different partners that year, Ferreira with Grant Stafford and Leach with David Macpherson.

Ferreira and Stafford lost in the semifinals to Leach and Macpherson.

Leach and Macpherson lost in the final 6–3, 7–6(9–7) against Mahesh Bhupathi and Leander Paes.

Seeds
Champion seeds are indicated in bold text while text in italics indicates the round in which those seeds were eliminated.

 Rick Leach /  David Macpherson (final)
 Bob Bryan /  Mike Bryan (semifinals)
 Ellis Ferreira /  Grant Stafford (semifinals)
 Mahesh Bhupathi /  Leander Paes (champions)

Draw

External links
 2001 Verizon Tennis Challenge Doubles draw

Verizon Tennis Challenge
2001 ATP Tour